Jed Perl (born 1951) is an American art critic and author in New York City. He was a longtime staff of The New Republic.

Career
Jed Perl initially trained as a painter. He holds a Bachelor of Arts from Columbia College and also studied at the Skowhegan School of Painting and Sculpture. He decided to devote himself fully to criticism in the mid-1980s. "In my twenties I was very involved in making art as well as writing about art," he said an interview, "but in the early 80s I came to what I guess I would describe as a fork in the road, and around 1985 I just decided to stop painting. A lot of people were not that surprised, they felt that’s where I was going."

Perl became one of the art critics at The New Criterion soon after its founding in 1982. From there he went on to editorial appointments at Art and Antiques, Salamagundi, Vogue, and Modern Painters before joining The New Republic in 1994. His essays have appeared there regularly since then.

Perl is the former Chairman of the Board of the Heliker-LaHotan Foundation, which is dedicated to the preservation and study of the art of John Heliker and Robert LaHotan and the maintenance of their former home on Great Cranberry Island, Maine as an artist residency. He was a friend of Heliker's and wrote the foreword for the catalogue of the exhibition "John Heliker: Drawing on the New Deal, 1932-1948" which originated at Stephen F. Austin State University in 2011.

Perl teaches at the New School for Social Research. His two-volume biography of Alexander Calder was published in 2017 and 2020.

"Laissez-faire aesthetics"
Perl is a longtime critic of what he sees as financially driven compromise of artistic standards among artists, collectors, galleries, and museums. He coined the phrase laissez-faire aesthetics to describe this phenomenon in a 2007 essay for The New Republic that became the introduction for his 2012 book Magicians and Charlatans.

Edward M. Gomez, reviewing Magicians and Charlatans for Hyperallergic in 2014, wrote, "even if Perl had published only this new book’s introduction ('Laissez-faire Aesthetics') as a pamphlet, it still could have served as something of a manifesto calling for a drastic reconsideration of the art world’s current methods and mores. It’s something of a cri de coeur from a well-informed observer who is deeply disappointed that dollar-value concerns have trumped aesthetic considerations of so much of what comes up for consumption in galleries and venerable museums."

Personal life 
His father was Martin Lewis Perl, who won the Nobel Prize in Physics in 1995 for his discovery of the tau lepton.

Bibliography

Books

Essays and reporting

Book reviews

Awards
 
 
 
 
 

Perl is also the recipient of a Renate, Hans and Maria Hofmann Trust Award from the New York Foundation for the Arts and awards from the Ingram Merrill Foundation.

Notes

Living people
1951 births
American art critics
Columbia College (New York) alumni
The New York Review of Books people